The Best of Apo Hiking Society Volume 1 is the first compilation album from the Filipino musical group Apo Hiking Society. It was released in 1982 under the Universal Records Philippines. The album is composed of 14 tracks taken from their previously released studio albums.

Track listing
 "Kaibigan"
 "Pumapatak Ang Ulan"
 "Pag-ibig"
 "Mahirap Magmahal Ng Syota Ng Iba"
 "Panalangin"
 "Batang-Bata Ka Pa"
 "Princesa"
 "Ewan"
 "Kabilugan Ng Buwan"
 "Doo Bidoo"
 "Salawikain"
 "Tuyo Na'ng Damdamin"
 "American Junk"
 "Show Me A Smile"

References

APO Hiking Society albums
1982 compilation albums